Cape Creek Bridge is an arch bridge that spans Cape Creek in Lane County, Oregon, United States. The bridge carries U.S. Route 101. Opened in 1932, it was designed by noted bridge engineer Conde McCullough and built of reinforced concrete by John K. Holt. The bridge resembles a Roman aqueduct, with a single parabolic arch that spans half its length. It was listed as Cape Creek Bridge No. 01113 on the National Register of Historic Places in 2005, as part of the C. B. McCullough Major Oregon Coast Highway Bridges MPS (Multiple Property Submission).

Corrosion protection
The Cape Creek Bridge has been impressed-current cathodically protected (ICCP) from corrosion since 1991. Rebar in concrete is highly susceptible to corrosion by chloride ions from seawater and de-icing salts. Contractors to the Oregon Department of Transportation have plasma-sprayed  of  zinc onto the exposed concrete to provide a sacrificial anode that corrodes in lieu of the steel rebar.

See also

Heceta Head
List of bridges documented by the Historic American Engineering Record in Oregon
List of bridges on the National Register of Historic Places in Oregon
List of bridges on U.S. Route 101 in Oregon

References

External links

Open-spandrel deck arch bridges in the United States
Oregon Coast
Road bridges on the National Register of Historic Places in Oregon
Bridges completed in 1932
U.S. Route 101
National Register of Historic Places in Lane County, Oregon
Bridges in Lane County, Oregon
Concrete bridges in Oregon
Historic American Engineering Record in Oregon
Bridges by Conde McCullough
Bridges of the United States Numbered Highway System
1932 establishments in Oregon